Laeva is a village in Tartu Parish, Tartu County, Estonia. Prior to 2017, it was administrative centre of Laeva Parish.

References

 

Villages in Tartu County
Kreis Dorpat